Walter Nicolau Herbert Max Johan von Hütschler (1906 in Sao Paulo, Brazil - 1997) was German-Brazilian sailor in the Star class. He won the 1938 and 1939 editions of the Star World Championships.

References

Brazilian male sailors (sport)
Star class sailors
Brazilian people of German descent
Star class world champions
World champions in sailing for Brazil
1906 births
1997 deaths